Vawkavysk or Volkovysk is a town in Grodno Region, Belarus, and the administrative center of Vawkavysk District. Its population is estimated at 43,826 inhabitants. It is one of the oldest towns in the region.

Vawkavysk was first unofficially mentioned in the Turov Annals in 1005 and this year is widely accepted as the founding year for Vawkavysk. At that time it was a city-fortress on the border of the Baltic and the Slavic ethnic groups. Since the 12th century, Vawkavysk was the center of a small princedom. The Hypatian Chronicle mentions the city in 1252.

Toponymy
The name is thought to be derived from the local dialect for the phrases for searching for wolves or the howling of wolves. Old Belarusian tradition refers to the area surrounding Vawkavysk as once being occupied by vast forestry filled with wolves. The river flowing through the town was named the Wołkowyja River. This also explains the appearance of a wolf's head or body on the town's coat of arms.

However, modern scholars have also hypothesized that the name of Vawkavysk was of more recent origin and hence succeeded the original legend. Vawkavysk was mentioned in a manuscript written by the priest D. Bułakowski at the end of the 16th or beginning of the 17th century. It was stored in the Sapieha family's library in Ruzhany Palace, where it was translated into Russian in 1881 and published in a Vilnius gazette. According to the manuscript, in the place where Vawkavysk is now situated, were large swathes of forest, through which flowed the now non-existent Nietupa River, and consisted of winding travel routes on which travelers were frequently attacked. Within this forest, two robbers, named Voloko and Visek, had their hide-out. A prince named Vladislav Zabeyko, upon hearing of these attacks, tracked down the robbers and hung them on trees for the birds to feed upon. A settlement was built in the location of the robbers' hide-out, which was named Volokovysek, and occupied by slaves. At the execution site, a large stone was placed but, according to local tradition, was later broken up to be used to build a temple.

Geography

The historical core of Vawkavysk lies on the left bank of the river. The town has been expanding to the west and south. Its raion is bordered by those of Masty to the north, Zel’va to the east, Pruzhany of Brest Oblast to the south, Svislach to the southwest, and Byerastavitsa to the west.

The perimeter of the flat top is surrounded by a powerful defensive wall broken in the south by the entrance. The mountains of Zamchishche ('Castle Mountain') and Muravelnik ('Mouse Mountain') lie to the west and east of Swedish Mountain, respectively.

Climate
Vawkavysk lies in the warm summer continental or hemiboreal (Dfb) climate zone, with four seasons and uniformly spread precipitation. Monthly averages range from -5.0 °C (23 °F) in January to 17.9 °C (64.2 °F) in July. On average, there are 95 days a year when there is snow cover. The average period of vegetation is 194 days, and it lasts from April to October. The highest officially recorded temperature in Vawkavysk was 36 °C (96.8 °F) in 1959, while on the other end, the lowest temperature was -38 °C (-36.4 °F) in 1950.

History

Prehistory

Prior to the 10th century, there were three fortified settlements on the territory of Vawkavysk. Swedish Mountain, along with Muravelnike, and Zamchishcha are considered the territories of current Vawkavysk. Swedish Mountain is a remnant of one of these fortifications. Gradually, as the settlement grew, the boundaries of the town extended to the neighboring hill of Zamchishcha. Industrical and commercial sites were located at the foot of Swedish Mountain along its northern, eastern, and southern sides. Muravelnike was also inhabited, but was not as populated as Swedish Mountain and Zamchishcha. Due to flooding of the Wołkowyja River, there are no other known archaeological sites.

Middle Ages
Vawkavysk is one of the oldest towns in Eastern Europe and has played a role in the political development of medieval Slavic civilization. It is believed that Vawkavysk was founded in the 10th century. The origin of the town is developed by legends, one of which tells about a prince Vladislav Zabeyko, who in 738 found robbers named Voloka and Visek and killed them. In the place of their shelter, 10 huts were built, which expanded into a settlement. According to the legend, the name Vawkavysk is derived from the names of the two robbers. Another legend states that the town was founded by the King of Lithuania, Mindaugas.

There is little historical evidence pertaining to the period when the town was founded. Archaeological excavations conducted at the site of the ancient town attest that a Slavic settlement had already existed in the area by the late 10th century, based on the dwellings and defensive works which were discovered during the excavation. Vawkavysk was first unofficially mentioned in the Turov Annals in 1005 and this year has been widely accepted as the town's founding year. Vawkavysk turned into a town and became a center of crafts and trades in the early 12th century. In 1224 and 1241, the Mongol invasion of Rus led by Batu Khan destroyed Vawkavysk and its fortress.

Vawkavysk lies in a region formerly referred to as Black Ruthenia that was subjugated to various invading forces from Baltic and Slavic tribes. At various times, the town was influenced by the Principality of Polotsk and Galicia-Volhynia. On the nights of 15 and 16 February 1038, the town was destroyed by a Baltic tribe of Yatvingians. Up until 1084, this territory belonged to Slavic Kievan Rus and later became a dependent vassal state. After Mindaugas conquered the area in 1239, it was incorporated into what would later become the Grand Duchy of Lithuania and was administered from Navahrudak from the 1240s to the 1250s.

Vawkavysk's location on the border between Lithuania and neighboring Galicia-Volhynia resulted in frequent fighting over these territories. The Ipatiev Chronicle mentions Vawkavysk in connection with an invasion of the Galicia-Volhynian prince Daniel Romanovich Galitsky and his brother Vasilko in 1252. Power exchanged periodically during the years of 1254-1258 between the princes of these two kingdoms. The chronicle continues with describing that a peace treaty was signed in 1254 where the Grand Duke of Lithuania, Vaišvilkas, transferred Vawkavysk, along with several other towns, to Daniel's son, Roman Danylovich Galitsky. Sometime after this event, in 1255, a prince named Gleb, who acknowledged himself as a vassal of the Grand Duke of Lithuania, became the ruler of Vawkavysk. Prince Gleb participated in a Galicia-Volhynian campaign against the Yatvingians in 1256.

It was not until 1258, after several years of war, that Vawkavysk and Slonim settled as vassal states of Lithuania  with Vaišvilkas again reigning from Navahrudak as a vassal of Mindaugas. In 1260, Vaišvilkas and another Lithuanian prince, Toth, captured and killed Roman, which resulted in Daniel marching to the upper reaches of the Neman River to recapture Vawkavysk and take Gleb as prisoner. The chronicle fails to explain what ended this particular campaign. Meanwhile, in 1263, Mindaugas of Lithuania was murdered. In the chaos that followed Mindaugas' assassination, the lands of the Grand Duchy were in disarray, with both local and foreign rulers struggling for power. Additionally, in 1264, Daniel died and his son Svarn Danylovich Galitsky received nominal overlordship over all of the Kingdom of Galicia–Volhynia as its duke, including Vawkavysk. Ownership of the town in 1269 belonged to prince Vladimir.

Following Svarn's loss of the throne in 1269, his brother Lev I of Galicia entered into conflict with Lithuania. In 1274–1276 he fought a war with the new Lithuanian ruler Traidenis but was defeated, and Lithuania annexed the territory of Black Ruthenia with its city of Navahrudak.

During a campaign against the Lithuanians in 1277, the Rus army and their princes, Mstislav Danylovich, another son of Daniel; Vladimir Vasilkovich; and Yuri Lvovich, stopped for the night in Vawkavysk. The last time Vawkavysk is mentioned in the Ipatiev Chronicle is when Lithuanian Grand Duke Butigeidis transferred Vawkavysk to prince Mstislav Danylovich in exchange for peace in 1289.

Grand Duchy of Lithuania
Vawkavysk came under the rule of Grand Duke Vytenis and became part of the Grand Duchy of Lithuania in 1293.

It was from a now non-existent castle in Vawkavysk that, in 1385, Jogaila sent his envoys to Kraków to ask for the hand of the Queen of Poland, Jadwiga. He declared that he along with the Lithuanian people was to adopt the Catholic faith, and received the Polish envoys after a long-awaited decision on 11 January 1386. In 1386 Jogaila was baptized as Władysław II Jagiełło in Kraków and became King of Poland. Jagiełło, while in Vawkavysk in 1387, ordered the destruction of pagan deities.

In 1409 the town was attacked and plundered by the Teutonic Knights under the command of Hochmeister Ulrich von Jungingen and its residents taken captive. On 16 March 1410, the town was seized again and burnt under the command of Ordensmarschall Frederic von Wallenrode and its residents were murdered. On 15 July 1410, the Vawkavysk banner participated in the Battle of Grunwald against the Teutonic Order. In 1430 the church of St. Nicholas was built. Vawkavysk was included in the composition of the Grand Duchy of Lithuania in 1441 after being under its authority since 1258.

In 1503 Vawkavysk was granted Magdeburg city rights by Polish king Alexander I Jagiellon. These rights were confirmed by different kings up to 1773. The town received its personal coat of arms of a wolf's head on a blue background. In 1507, Vawkavysk became part of the Nowogródek Voivodeship and was capital of Wołkowysk powiat until 1795. By 1513, Vawkavysk had 9 streets. A church was mentioned as having existed since 1536, while a monastery of Jesuits was founded in 1598. From 1566, Vawkavysk was also a venue for General Sejmiks, which provincial delegates and senators attended, that were held for the whole of Lithuania.  The most prominent nobility of Vawkavysk at this time included the Gołgowski and Piotrowicz families.

Polish–Lithuanian Commonwealth
The Union of Lublin was signed July 1, 1569, in Lublin, Poland, and created a single state, the Polish–Lithuanian Commonwealth. It replaced the personal union of the Crown of the Kingdom of Poland and the Grand Duchy of Lithuania with a real union and an elective monarchy, since Sigismund II Augustus, the last of the Jagiellons, remained childless after three marriages. Subsequent to this, Vawkavysk became a town within the Commonwealth.

The 17th century was a very difficult time in the history of Vawkavysk, in particular, and the Polish-Lithuanian Commonwealth in general. The region became the scene of many wars.  It was during this time that the Polish-Lithuanian Commonwealth entered into a series of mid-17th century campaigns, known as The Deluge, consisting of uprisings, invasions and Northern Wars with Russia and Sweden. Following the popular uprising led by Bohdan Khmelnytsky in Ukraine, the rebellion brought into focus the rivalry between Russia and the Commonwealth for hegemony over Ukraine and over the eastern Slavic lands in general. In October 1653 the Russian zemsky sobor declared war on the Commonwealth and in June 1654, the forces of Tsar Alexis of Russia invaded the eastern half of Poland-Lithuania, starting the Russo-Polish War of 1654-67. During this time, Vawkavysk was captured twice by Russian troops in 1655 and 1662 and left heavily damaged.

At the same time, the Swedish Empire, which technically already was in conflict, although with a cease-fire agreement, with the Commonwealth from the Polish-Swedish War of 1626-29, invaded in July 1654 and occupied the remaining half of the country. In 1656, after three days of battle, Vawkavysk was destroyed and burned by the army of King Charles X Gustav of Sweden. The administrative center of the town was a castle on the river near the road to Izabelin, which was destroyed alongside the town.

During the Great Northern War in 1706, the Swedes attacked Vawkavysk again, which resulted in the residents demanding large indemnity.

In 1736, a Jesuit mission was formed at the expense of a E. Linovskiy, as well as a school in 1747. By the second half of the 18th century, several Jesuit and Marianite monasteries operated in Vawkavysk. As of 1792, the town had about 1,000 buildings, and a church in which the Uniates used as well.

The region participated in the Kościuszko Uprising in 1794, temporarily freeing the area from under the Russian occupation.

By the end of the 18th century, the town had only 362 houses, where the population consisted of 2,127 people.

Russian Empire
Vawkavysk eventually became a part of the Russian Empire in 1795, following the third partition of Poland.

During the French invasion of Russia in 1812, Vawkavysk housed the headquarters of General Pyotr Bagration, commander of the 2nd Russian Army. On 2–4 November 1812, during a battle between the French and Russian forces, Vawkavysk was burned. Russian General Fabian Gottlieb von Osten-Sacken defeated the VII Saxon Corps of French General Jean Reynier. The Congress of Vienna in 1815 confirmed Vawkavysk's belonging to Russia.

In 1844, Vawkavysk had a wooden church and another church, a parish school, two hospitals, and a pharmacy. In 1845, the town received new Russian coat of arms. As of 1860, Vawkavysk had four hundred ninety-two homes, two schools, St. Wenceslas church, seven Jewish prayer houses, a synagogue, a brick factory, two mills, a hospital, and fifty-eight shops.

In 1863, a company from Vawkavysk under the command of Gustaw Strawiński took part in the January Uprising.

In 1885, the town began construction of what would become an important railway junction between Baranovichi and Białystok. The railway station was opened in 1886.

By 1891, Vawkavysk had 19 industrial enterprises. In 1906, the town began construction of a railway line to Siedlce; once construction was completed in 1907, the town became an important railway junction.

World War I and the Interbellum
During the First World War, Vawkavysk was the headquarters of the commander-in-chief of the North-Western Front. In the autumn of 1915, the town was occupied by German troops. Following the collapse of Imperial Russia in 1917, the subsequent emergence of the new Bolshevik government of the Russian Soviet Federative Socialist Republic, and the signing of the armistice between Russia and the Central Powers, Vawkavysk and the surrounding area temporarily laid within Russian territory. The signing of the Treaty of Brest-Litovsk on 3 March 1918, between Russia and the Central Powers (Germany, Austria-Hungary, Bulgaria, and Turkey) ended Russia's participation in World War I. In this peace treaty, Russia renounced all territorial claims in Finland (which it had already acknowledged), the future Baltic states (Estonia, Latvia and Lithuania), Belarus, and Ukraine. During the negotiations of the Treaty of Brest-Litovsk, Belarus first declared independence under German occupation on 25 March 1918, forming the Belarusian People's Republic. Meanwhile, an independent Polish state was restored in 1918, but its borders were not formally determined.

Polish–Soviet War

By 1919 Bolsheviks took control over Belarus and forced the country's democratic government into exile. Immediately afterwards, the Polish–Soviet War ignited, and the territory of Belarus was divided between Poland and Soviet Russia. On 8 February 1919 Vawkavysk was occupied by Polish troops. The town was then captured by the 16th Bolshevik Army on 24 July 1920 and subsequently recaptured on 27 September 1920 by the 3rd Legions Infantry Division under the command of General Leon Berbecki.

Second Polish Republic
The Treaty of Riga was signed in Riga on 18 March 1921, between Poland, Soviet Russia (acting also on behalf of Soviet Belarus) and Soviet Ukraine. The treaty ended the Polish-Bolshevik War. Following this, Vawkavysk became a part of the interwar Second Polish Republic in the period between 1919 and 1939. Wołkowysk powiat was part of the Białystok Voivodeship and the seat of gmina Biskupice.

On 8 December 1922 the 3rd Regiment of Mounted Riflemen entered the town's barracks. In 1924 the 8th Cavalry Brigade Command was created. As of 1939 Vawkavysk contained an iron foundry, two brick factories, two sawmills, and other small businesses. On the outskirts of town was a cement plant, which was considered one of the most powerful companies in Western Belarus.

World War II

Upon the invasion of the Second Polish Republic by Nazi Germany and the Soviet Union, the Wołkowysk Reserve Cavalry Brigade was formed. Vawkavysk came under Soviet occupation on 18 September 1939 as a result of the German–Soviet Treaty of Friendship, Cooperation and Demarcation. On 2 November 1939, Vawkavysk, along with the rest of Western Belarus, was annexed by the Soviet Union. On November 14, 1939, it was included into the Byelorussian Soviet Socialist Republic. Vawkavysk became the regional capital of the Belastok Region within the Byelorussian SSR on 15 January 1940. The town was a point of detention and deportation of German and Polish prisoners of war, including prisoner-of-war camp 281 by the Red Army until 1941.

Vawkavysk was occupied by the German Army on 28 June 1941. At that time, about 7,000 Jews lived in the town, around 40 percent of the population. Around 1,000 people, mostly but not entirely Jews, were killed in the Luftwaffe bombardment of the town. Upon arrival, the Germans, with some assistance by local Poles and Belarusians, murdered several dozen Jews within the first week; another 200 were murdered in mid July, mostly business and professional men along with those who had handicaps. That summer, the Germans established a ghetto, forcing the town's Jewish population into it. Five to ten families lived in each residence. The Germans conscripted Jews for forced labor of demolishing buildings and constructing new ones.

The ghetto became a transit ghetto for Jews of Kreis Wolkowysk.  About 20,000 Jews passed through it; most were sent on to Treblinka where they were immediately murdered.  Others died in the ghetto from typhus or starvation. In December 1942, part of the transit camp was converted to a closed ghetto for about 2,000 Jews, mostly essential male workers who were allowed to leave each day to go to the work sites. As many as 500 Jews were transferred to the Bialystok ghetto, some of them were able to escape into the local forest. Several women cut their hair and dressed as men to pass for male laborers.

In January 1943, the final group of ghetto dwellers was sent to Auschwitz where most were murdered immediately.  About 70 Jews  of the original 7,000 Jewish residents survived the war.  Some of the survivors had fled to the Soviet Union at the beginning of the war; others fought in the forests as partisans and a few survived Auschwitz.

During the Belostok Offensive, on 14 July 1944, the 2nd Belarusian Front of the Red Army was able to recapture the town. The town became the regional center of Grodno Region in the BSSR on 20 September 1944.

After World War II
Following the conclusion of the European front of World War II in 1945, Vawkavysk came under the authority of the Belarusian Soviet Socialist Republic until the collapse of the Soviet Union in 1991. Since 1991, Vawkavysk has belonged to the Republic of Belarus.

3 March 1963 it became a town of regional subordination. 12 April 2001 held approval emblem and flag of the city. In 2004 it conducted the Vawkavysk republican festival of rural workers' Dozhinki.

Administration
Local issues are represented by the locally elected Councils of Deputies. These local councils operate on three levels:
primary (villages and towns), basic (towns and regional councils), and regional (oblast) (Regional Council of Deputies). Deputies are elected for four-year terms to deal with local issues and represent the local population in decisions on issues relating to health, education, social welfare, trade, and transport. Local Councils of Deputies make decisions on local issues within the framework of national legislation.

Settlements in the surrounding Vawkavysk region are Izabelin, Ros, Mstibovo, and Voŭpa.

The district includes the townships Krasnosel'skii and Ross, as well as 191 rural settlements.

In Region 2, Township Council - Rossky, Krasnosel'skii and nine village councils: Vereykovsky, Volkovysskii, Volpovsky, Gneznovsky, Elizabethan, Podorossky, Replevsky, Subochsky and Shilovichi.

Demographics

The town and surrounding area has a population of 74,000, while the urban area of Vawkavysk (with adjacent urban settlements of Ros and Krasnosel'skii included) has about 56,000 inhabitants, and the population of the rural area stands at 18,000 people. The main population groups according to nationality in the town of Vawkavysk are: Belarusians (63.4%), Poles (25%), Russians (8.7%), and other nationalities (2.9%). There are people of a total of 50 nationalities living in the area.

Religion
According to the Russian census, the population of Vawkavysk was 10,323 people (5,982 women and 4,341 men) in 1897. The main population groups according to religion were: Jews (5,528), Orthodox (2,716), and Roman Catholic (1,943).

Economy
The industrial sections of the city are dominated by the building materials industry (46.4%), and food processing (44%).

Major companies in Vawkavysk (unless otherwise indicated, all are "open joint stock companies"):
 Krasnoselskoe-Materials – produces sixteen types and brands of cement and asbestos cement sheets from slate, asbestos pipes and fittings, dry mortar, lime and hydrated developer, soft-granular chalk, concrete slabs for pavements, polyethylene shrink film, blocks of cellular concrete.
 Vawkavysk meat processing plant – one of the largest manufacturers of meat and meat products in the Grodno region and Belarus. The company produces more than 330 kinds of products, including the following: 
 Beef, pork, horsemeat and offal category 1 and 2;
 Semi-bone, à la carte, fleshy, beef, burgers, dumplings;
 Sausages, fats, dry food, skins and technical products;
 Endocrine-enzyme raw materials.
 Bellakt – the only company in Belarus that produces powdered infant formula and cereals for babies from the first days of life to one year and older. The company produces more than 40 types of powdered infant formula and cereals. The company also produces a wide range of dairy products, such as dried whole and skim milk, butter, whole milk, and a wide range of low-fat dairy products, soft cheeses, and whey products for animal feed.
 Vawkavysk Machine Building Plant – has a monopoly within the CIS in the field of casting pan mixers and mixers for abrasive masses. In addition, the company manufactures equipment for the preparation of concrete and mortar, press-forging equipment, farm use (grinding-mixing plants for the preparation of feed, dung conveyors, pumps for liquid manure). The company produces a wide range of consumer good of metal and plastic.
 Vawkavysk factory HMAC – production capacity and structure of primary production is divided into pressing and welding, mechanical and assembly plant located in the main building and allowing to work a closed technological cycle. The company specializes in the production of construction and finishing machines, including:
 Machines for painting works (installations for applying paint formulations, spray guns, tanks & paint injectors);
 Machines for plastering (units plastering, spackling, plastering and painting);
 Mixer.
 Consumer goods (hardware and lock products, rubber products for sanitary devices, hardware tools, gardening tools).

Sites of interest 
The Vawkavysk archaeological complex includes three hills: "the Swedish mountain", Zamchishche, and Muravelnik. "The Swedish mountain" is located in a southeast suburb of modern Vawkavysk. There is a legend that during The Deluge, "the Swedish mountain" was created by Swedish soldiers above the tomb of their commander. It is the highest point of associated hills in Vawkavysk.

The archaeological study of Vawkavysk begun in 1925 by the director of the Grodno Museum of History-Archaeology, who was the author of several history books about the area as well as travel guides on Grodno and the vicinity, which were popular in the Second Polish Republic.

Other local sights include the Roman Catholic Church of St. Wenceslas (1846–1848) and the Peter Bagration Museum.

International relations
List of Vawkavysk's twin towns and other forms of city cooperation and friendship: 
  Gusev, Russia
  Siedlce, Poland
  Șoldănești, Moldova

People
 Mikalay Autukhovich (born 1963), Belarusian businessman and political dissident, political prisoner
 Ludwik Benoit (1920–1992), Polish actor
 Benjamin Blumenfeld (1884–1947), Russian chess master
 Aleksandr Dedyushko (1962–2007), Russian television actor, best known for war dramas and the Russian version of "Dancing with the Stars".
 Eliyahu Golomb (1893–1945), leader of the Jewish defense effort in Mandate Palestine and architect of the Haganah between 1920 and 1948.
 Dawid Janowski (1868–1927), Jewish-Polish chess player
 Paul Khomich (1893–1942), Roman Catholic Church priest
 Tadeusz Kruczkowski (born 1961), historian, president of Związek Polaków na Białorusi (2000–2005)
 Raphael Lemkin (1900–1959), known for defining the term genocide and drafting the Convention on the Prevention and Punishment of the Crime of Genocide
 Teresa Torańska (1944–2013), Polish journalist, writer, historian
 Maksim Vitus (born 1989), football player
 Zerach Warhaftig (1906–2002), Israeli lawyer and politician and a signatory of Israel's Declaration of Independence.
 Yanina Zhejmo (1909–1987), Soviet actress.
Ida Oranovich Creskoff (1899-1982), Graduate  of Temple University (1921) and the University of Pennsylvania Law School (1924).  First woman ever appointed Clerk of a U.S. Federal Court of Appeals (1947), and still only woman to hold the position upon her retirement in 1967.

See also

Grodno Governorate

Notes

References 
 Portal of Vawkavysk. Photos, articles, history, news, forum, etc.
 Independent, most popular site of Volkovysk and Volkovysk district
 Photos on Radzima.org
 Photogallery of Vawkavysk
 Histori of Vawkavysk in democratic site
 

 
Towns in Belarus
Populated places in Grodno Region
Nowogródek Voivodeship (1507–1795)
Volkovyssky Uyezd
Białystok Voivodeship (1919–1939)
Belastok Region
Shtetls
Holocaust locations in Belarus
Vawkavysk District